Political Intelligence Department may refer to:

Political Intelligence Department (1918–1920)
Political Intelligence Department (1939–1943)